Siward may refer to:

 Synardus or Siward (12th-century), king of Götaland
 Siward (Abbot of Abingdon) (died 1048), Bishop of St. Martins
 Siward, Earl of Northumbria (died 1055), Anglo-Scandinavian earl of Northumbria (also portrayed as a character in Shakespeare's Macbeth)
 Siward (bishop of Rochester) (died 1075) Bishop of Rochester
 Siward Barn (fl. 1066–1087), English resistor to William the Conqueror
 Richard Siward (died 1248), 13th-century soldier
 Young Siward, a character in William Shakespeare's play Macbeth
 Siward, king of Norway, a probably fictional figure in the Gesta Danorum; see Lagertha

See also
 
 Seward (disambiguation)
 Sigurd (disambiguation)